The 2005 season was the Washington Redskins'  74th in the National Football League and the second season under head coach Joe Gibbs. The team improved on their 6–10 record from 2004 and finished 10–6. The Redskins placed 2nd in the NFC East. Washington earned their first playoff berth since 1999.
In their return to the postseason, the Redskins defeated the Tampa Bay Buccaneers  in the opening round, but a loss to the Seattle Seahawks the following week ended their season. The Seahawks went on to become NFC Champions.

This season is the last season to date in which Washington has won a playoff game. They have gone 0–5 in playoff games since, losing three of them (including in this 2005 season) to Seattle.

Offseason
The Redskins started the offseason by adding a new Quarterbacks Coach, Bill Musgrave.  Musgrave was the former offensive coordinator for the Jacksonville Jaguars and had worked with quarterback Mark Brunell before.  Musgrave added the shotgun formation to Washington's playbook.

During the offseason, the Redskins lost cornerback Fred Smoot and starting linebacker Antonio Pierce to free agency.

The Redskins signed the following free agents: center Casey Rabach, wide receiver David Patten, and strong safety Pierson Prioleau.

The Redskins restructured the contract of Pro Bowl left tackle Chris Samuels, with the "seven-year deal is worth roughly $47 million and includes the richest signing bonus in franchise history."

The Redskins also traded wide receiver Laveranues Coles to the New York Jets for wide receiver Santana Moss.  Most sports writers thought that this was a lopsided deal and that the Redskins were getting the worse end of the trade.

In the 2005 NFL Draft, the Redskins drafted Auburn cornerback Carlos Rogers with the ninth pick. Later in the 1st round, they traded their third round pick in the 2005 draft and their first and fourth round picks in the 2006 draft to the Denver Broncos for the 25th overall pick.  With the 25th overall pick, the Redskins selected Auburn quarterback Jason Campbell.  The Redskins used their remaining picks to draft UCLA fullback Manuel White, Louisville linebacker Robert McCune, Stanford linebacker Jared Newberry, and Citadel fullback Nehemiah Broughton.

The Redskins finished the 2005 preseason with a record of 1–3, losing to the Carolina Panthers 28–10, losing to the Cincinnati Bengals 24–17, defeating the Pittsburgh Steelers 17–10, and losing to the Baltimore Ravens 26–20.

Staff

NFL Draft

Roster

Preseason

Regular season

Schedule

Standings

Regular season recap

Week 1: vs. Chicago Bears

    
    
    
    

The Redskins started the regular season against the Chicago Bears at home on September 11. The Redskins defense allowed only 41 rushing yards and 125 passing yards. The only score they allowed was a 1-yard Thomas Jones run.  On one crucial drive for the Bears, when they needed a field goal to win, the Redskins forced three false starts and a sack to make it third-and-38.  The Bears couldn't convert and the Redskins went on to win their first game in the 2005 season.  Stats

Week 2: at Dallas Cowboys

at Texas Stadium, Dallas, Texas

The Redskins traveled to Texas Stadium in Irving, Texas to take on one of their NFC East rivals, the Dallas Cowboys, in a Monday Night match-up. The Redskins trailed the entire game up until 3:46 left in the game.  Dallas kicker Jose Cortez completed a 33-yard field goal in the second quarter. In the third quarter, quarterback Drew Bledsoe threw a 70-yard pass to Terry Glenn on a flea flicker.  With 5:58 left to go in the game, Cortez completed another field goal of 41-yards. It looked as there was not a single hope left for Washington. On a fourth-and-15 play, Mark Brunell threw a 39-yard touchdown pass to Santana Moss with 3:46 to go. Moss got behind Dallas defensive back Roy Williams and streaked to the post to make the catch in the endzone.  A 5-yard offside penalty on Dallas during Washington's extra point attempt allowed Washington to kick off from their own 35. But kicker Nick Novak was still unable to put it in the endzone, allowing Dallas return man Tyson Thompson to return the kick nearly to midfield. Novak atoned for the short kick by making the touchdown-saving tackle. After allowing one first down, the Washington defense held—thanks in part to Dallas' decision to abandon the run game while trying to run out the clock. Bledsoe threw numerous incompletions, stopping the clock and letting Washington conserve their timeouts. On top of that, Flozell Adams committed a key holding penalty which negated a first-down catch by Keyshawn Johnson on 3rd-and-8. On 4th-and-5, Dallas punter Mat McBriar fielded a low snap and punted it into the endzone for a touchback, giving Washington the ball at their 20-yard line with 2:52 remaining. Following a 10-yard completion to Clinton Portis, Brunell connected with Moss again, who caught it in stride—again behind Roy Williams—and raced into the endzone. The Cowboys made one final push to win the game, but the Redskins stopped them on fourth down to complete what is known as the "Monday Night Miracle". With the win, the Redskins moved to 2–0. Stats

Week 4: vs. Seattle Seahawks

at FedExField, Landover, Maryland

The Washington Redskins defeated the Seattle Seahawks by the score of 20–17. The Seahawks led early but the Redskins came back to lead by 7.  With 1:23 left, Matt Hasselbeck threw a 6-yard touchdown pass to Darrell Jackson to tie the game.  The Redskins won the coin toss and elected to receive the ball.  They converted three third downs to get to Seattle's 22-yard line. Nick Novak kicked a 39-yard field goal to win the game for Washington. The Redskins were 3–0 for the first time since the 1991 Regular Season which led them to their latest Super Bowl victory to date.Stats

Week 5: at Denver Broncos

at Invesco Field, Denver, Colorado

Despite having 447 net yards, the Redskins were defeated by the Broncos, 21–19.  Down 21–10 in the fourth quarter, the Redskins made a push to tie the game. Nick Novak kicked a field goal from 36 yards with 6:27 left.  Washington got the ball back and drove down the field.  On second-and-5, Mark Brunell passed to Chris Cooley for a touchdown.  The Redskins tried for the 2-point conversion but fail.  Denver recovered the onside kick and win the game. With their first loss of the season, the Redskins dropped to 3–1. Stats

Week 6: at Kansas City Chiefs

The game was close at the half with the Redskins leading 7–6. Their lead soon disappeared as the Chiefs took a 14–7 lead on a 6-yard touchdown run by Priest Holmes. After Mark Brunell was sacked for a 9-yard loss, Santana Moss tied the game on a quick pass to the left flat as he ran 78-yards for a touchdown. The Chiefs retook a 21–14 lead on a Sammy Knight fumble recovery for an 80-yard touchdown along with a successful two-point conversion. In the final seconds of the third quarter, Brunell hit Chris Cooley with an 11-yard touchdown catch to tie the game once again at 21–21. Trent Green hit Holmes on a 60-yard touchdown catch to seal the deal for the Chiefs as Brunell and the Redskins failed in an attempted comeback in the final seconds of the fourth quarter. With the loss, the Redskins dropped to 3–2.

Week 7: vs San Francisco 49ers

After two close, consecutive, and heartbreaking AFC losses in the last two weeks, the Redskins returned home to welcome the lowly 49ers to town and unleashed a scoring barrage, winning 52–17. After failing to score on their opening drive in each of their first five games, Washington scored first on a 6-play, 61-yard drive that ended with a 2-yard touchdown pass from Mark Brunell to Mike Sellers. After forcing another San Francisco punt, the Redskins drove another 60 yards for another score, this time a 5-yard run from Clinton Portis. After two more touchdown passes by Brunell, one each to Sellers and Santana Moss, combined with two more 1-yard touchdown runs by Portis and a Nick Novak field goal, the Redskins led 45–7 after three quarters. Washington finished their blowout with a 4-yard touchdown run by Rock Cartwright to make it 52–7. San Francisco did score twice on a 72-yard run by Frank Gore and a 47-yard field goal by Joe Nedney. With the win, Washington improved to 4–2.

Week 8: at New York Giants

Following their lopsided blowout win over the 49ers, the Redskins headed to the Meadowlands for an NFC East duel with the New York Giants. Looking to follow up with another impressive win, the afternoon turned out to be a miserable one for the Redskins, getting shut out 36–0. The Giants, playing with heavy hearts after the death of owner Wellington Mara, got off to a fast start with a 57-yard run on the game's first play, leading to a Jay Feely field goal. Barber finished with 206 rushing yards on 24 carries. The 36–0 shutout dropped the Redskins to 4–3.

Week 9: vs Philadelphia Eagles

Looking to rebound from a 36–0 shutout against the Giants, Washington returned home for a second consecutive NFC East matchup, this time against the Philadelphia Eagles. Earlier in the week, Eagles WR Terrell Owens was suspended for conduct detrimental to the team. During the game, Philadelphia drew first blood with a 56-yard touchdown pass from Donovan McNabb to Reggie Brown that put Philadelphia up 7–0 after the first quarter. Washington responded with a John Hall field goal and a Mike Sellers touchdown run to lead 10–7 at the half. In the third, the Eagles added a David Akers field goal, and the Redskins responded with a Clinton Portis touchdown run to make the score 17–10. In the fourth quarter, with time winding down, the Eagles driving, safety Ryan Clark intercepted a McNabb pass with 1:25 remaining, sealing the win and improving the Redskins to 5–3 at the halfway point in the season.

Week 10: at Tampa Bay Buccaneers

At the halfway point of the season, the Redskins' record stood at 5–3, tied for second in the NFC East with Dallas. On Week 10, the Redskins marched to Tampa Bay for a matchup against the Buccaneers. Tampa Bay struck first with two touchdown runs by Mike Alstott. This made the score 14–3, with the only Washington points coming on a John Hall field goal. After Alstott's second touchdown, Ladell Betts returned the ensuing kickoff 94 yards to bring the score to 14–10. Tampa Bay responded with a 24-yard touchdown pass from Chris Simms to Joey Galloway, making the score 21–10. Washington got another John Hall field goal to make the score 21–13 at halftime.

After halftime, Washington took their first drive of the second half into the endzone on a 7-yard pass from Mark Brunell to Mike Sellers, followed by a converted 2-point conversion on a pass to Clinton Portis, tying the game. Washington also scored on a 17-yard touchdown pass to Ladell Betts, giving the Redskins a 28–21 lead. As the third quarter winded down, Simms completed a 4-yard pass to Ike Hilliard to tie the game at 28–28 entering the fourth quarter. Portis added a 5-yard touchdown run to give the Redskins a 35–28 lead. With the game on the line, Simms led Tampa Bay to a game-winning touchdown drive with a 30-yard pass to Edell Shepherd. The Redskins appeared to have blocked the extra point attempt, but were ruled offsides. As a result, Tampa Bay elected to go for two, and successfully converted on a controversial run by Alstott, handing the Redskins a 36–35 loss and dropping them to 5–4 on the season.

Week 14:  at Arizona Cardinals

Week 16: vs. New York Giants

Playoffs

Summary
The Redskins earned a playoff berth on the back of a 5-game winning streak to end the season. They beat the Tampa Bay Buccaneers in the Wild Card round before losing to the Seattle Seahawks in the Divisional round. It was the Redskins' first trip to the playoffs and first playoff win since the 1999–2000 NFL playoffs.

Schedule

References

Washington
Washington Redskins seasons
Red